Monoharpur Union is a Union Parishad under Manirampur Upazila of Jessore District in the division of Khulna, Bangladesh.

References

Unions of Manirampur Upazila
Unions of Jessore District
Unions of Khulna Division